Pogey Beach is a Canadian comedy film, directed by Jeremy Larter and released in 2018. Spun off from the web series Just Passing Through, whose characters were fans of an in-universe television series called Pogey Beach, the film depicts the world inside the show-within-a-show through a storyline centred on Bethany (Celia Owen), a teenage girl who moves from Toronto to Tracadie, Prince Edward Island with her father Winslow (Dennis Trainor), and becomes fascinated by the diverse personalities who hang out at the local beach.

The film also stars Robbie Carruthers as Gary Gallant, the leader of the local beach gang who values his leisurely lifestyle and will do almost anything to avoid being sent to work at the local fish plant, and Ryan Cameron as his archrival Lyle MacDonald.

Production
The film was funded in part by a Kickstarter campaign, and shot in 2016. However, the team ran out of money to finish the final edit, until receiving a production grant from the Atlantic office of Telefilm Canada in late 2017.

The film premiered at the Atlantic Film Festival in 2018.

Awards
The film won the Canadian Comedy Award for Best Feature Film at the 19th Canadian Comedy Awards in 2019. It also received nominations for Best Direction in a Feature Film (Larter) and Best Writing in a Feature Film (Jeremy Larter, Jason Larter, Geoff Read, Robbie Moses).

References

External links

2018 films
2018 comedy films
Canadian comedy films
English-language Canadian films
Films shot in Prince Edward Island
Films set in Prince Edward Island
2010s English-language films
2010s Canadian films